Lakhani is a Town and headquarter of Lakhani Taluka in Bhandara District of Maharashtra, India. It has the largest flyover in Bhandara district at 3.50 km. Lakhani is 21.3 km from its District Main City Bhandara and 837km from the state capital of Mumbai.

Description

Lakhani is popularly known as the Pune of Vidharbha for its rich cultural and educational heritage. This area is also famous for Shankar Pat (bullkkart race), Dandar (a traditional music) and jalsa (musical concert). And Lakhani is the biggest Dussehra festival in Bhandara and Gondia district Organized By Dashahara Utsav Samiti Lakhani The ancient city Ramtek is sixty kilometers from Lakhani. Lakhani is among the top cities in Bhandara district and it is very peaceful village. Its population is about 20000 and is very famous for its educational concern. Ashok Leyland is situated near Lakhani at about a distance of 7 km in the village Rajegaon MIDC. Its Pin Code is 441804. It is on National Highway No.6.

Economy

Nationalised Banks in Lakhani include Bank of India (BOI), Bank of Maharashtra and State Bank of India (SBI). Sindhi Line is the main market. Sindhi Line is the very crowded street in Lakhani where main market is situated. State bank of India is situated near the Bus stop of Lakhani. Bank of India is situated near the Sindhi Line, where another famous Gujrati hotel is famous for its Sweets so called Dhandhukia Misthanna.

Education
Schools and colleges in Lakhani include The only Military School in District Late N. P. W. Military School, Samarth Vidyalaya, Gandhi Vidyalaya, Ranilaxmibai Vidhyalaya, Universal English Med School, Vidharbha senior college, Late Nirdhan Patil Waghaye Arts, Comm And Science College and Samarth Mahavidyalaya.
Samarth Vidyalaya, sidharth high scl has its own very big playground and here the festival of Dushehara is organised every year. This festival is famous in all over the district because of its Fireworks show.

Sights

The wild life sanctuary Nagzira and National forest that is Navegaon Bandh is forty kilometers  and fifty Km respectively from Lakhani. The dense forest includes picnic spots like Ravanwadi and several fish ponds.and picnic spots Oxygen Park is also in Lakhani.

Transport
The Dr. Babasaheb Ambedkar airport is 90 km from town. A rail stations  is in Bhandara 29 km from town.

Cities and towns in Bhandara district